976-EVIL is a 1988 horror film directed by Robert Englund, and co-written by Brian Helgeland. It stars Stephen Geoffreys, Jim Metzler, Maria Rubell, Patrick O'Bryan, and Sandy Dennis.

The film's title refers to the 976 telephone exchange, a now mostly defunct premium-rate telephone number system that was popular in the late 1980s, but has since been superseded by area code 900.

Plot
Cousins Leonard "Spike" Johnson (Patrick O'Bryan) and Hoax Arthur Wilmoth (Stephen Geoffreys) are teenagers who live with Hoax's overtly religious and domineering mother Lucy Wilmoth (Sandy Dennis). While Spike is the neighborhood motorcycle bad boy, Hoax is an introverted nerd. Even though Spike genuinely cares for his cousin and protects him from bullies, Hoax is filled with resentment that he cannot stand up for himself or get the girl he wants (both of which Spike does effortlessly).

Both boys stumble upon 976-EVIL, which on the surface is just a novelty phone line that gives creepy-themed fortunes for a few dollars. However, the line is actually used by Satan to subtly corrupt mortals into his bidding. Spike loses interest in the line quickly, but Hoax soon discovers the true nature of the line and uses it to get revenge on everyone who has wronged him.

Soon Hoax's spirit is almost entirely consumed by Satan, who possesses Hoax to cause death and destruction, culminating in an opening to Hell appearing before their house. Spike confronts Hoax, but is quickly overpowered. In a desperate last ploy, he calls earnestly to his cousin, reminding him of the plans they had to take a vacation that summer.

Hoax's fleeting soul resurfaces briefly, and realizes his horrible mistake and embraces Spike, begging for help. Spike, realizing Hoax is lost and cannot be separated from the demonic presence, betrays his cousin and throws him into the pit of Hell.

Cast
 Stephen Geoffreys as Hoax Arthur Wilmoth
 Patrick O'Bryan as Leonard "Spike" Johnson
 Lezlie Deane as Suzie
 Jim Metzler as Marty Palmer
 Maria Rubell as Angela Martinez
 Sandy Dennis as Aunt Lucy Wilmoth
 J.J. Cohen as Marcus
 Darren E. Burrows as Jeff
 Gunther Jenson as "Airhead"
 Jim Thiebaud as "Rags"
 Wendy J. Cooke as Gang Girl
 Robert Picardo as Mark Dark
 J.J. Johnston as Virgil
 Paul Willson as Mr. Michaels
 Greg Collins as Mr. Selby
 Demetre Phillips as Sergeant Bell
 Don Bajema as Deputy
 Roxanne Rogers as Angel, The Waitress
 Joanna Keyes as Suzie's Mother 
 Tom McFadden as Minister
 Bert Hinchman as The Coroner 
 Cynthia Szigeti as Female Operator
 John Currie Slade as John Doe
 Mindy Seeger as Female Victim
 Quigley The Parrot as Aunt Lucy's Parrot

Release
The film was released theatrically in the United States by New Line Cinema in March 1989. It grossed $2,955,917 at the box office.

The film was released on home video by RCA/Columbia Pictures Home Video the same year. VHS, and LaserDisc versions of the film are uncut and contain footage previously unseen in its original theatrical release.

The film was released on DVD by Sony Pictures Home Entertainment in 2002. The DVD version as well as the Crackle version are the theatrical cut. Both versions were released on Blu-ray on October 3, 2017. It was released on UK Blu-ray by Eureka Entertainment on October 19, 2020.

Critical reception 
976-EVIL received a negative critical reception and currently has an approval rating of 15% on review aggregator website Rotten Tomatoes, based on 13 reviews. The Washington Post wrote "From start to finish, 976-EVIL is a sorry, wrong number." AllMovie however defended the film, calling it "underrated". John Fallon of JoBlo.com gave the film 6/10 stars and remarked that it "could've been great stuff", but "loses its touch in its second half, relying on unsatisfying murders and "ho-hum" effects to pad it up though."

Sequel
A direct-to-video sequel entitled 976-EVIL II: The Astral Factor was released in 1992, with Patrick O'Bryan reprising his role as Spike.

References

External links
 
 
 

1988 films
1988 horror films
1980s supernatural horror films
American films about revenge
American supernatural horror films
CineTel Films films
1980s English-language films
Films about bullying
Films directed by Robert Englund
Films with screenplays by Brian Helgeland
Prediction in popular culture
Telephone numbers in the United States
1989 directorial debut films
American exploitation films
Demons in film
Films about spirit possession
1980s American films